Douglas M. Greenwald (June 5, 1913, Manhattan – January 15, 1997, Sarasota) was an economist. He was among the National Association of Business Economists.
In 1965 he was elected as a Fellow of the American Statistical Association.

Education
He earned a bachelor's degree in economics from Temple University and his master's and Ph.D. in economics from George Washington University.

Career
Greenwald joined McGraw-Hill for in 1947 as a staff economist in the magazine division, retiring in 1978 as vice president for economics of the McGraw-Hill Publications Company. In retirement he was an adviser to Japanese executives and government officials as well as editor of the last two editions of the economics encyclopedia. He also wrote and edited seven books and edited the McGraw-Hill Dictionary of Modern Economics.

Awards

Japan awarded Greenwald the Third Class of the Order of the Sacred Treasure in 1986.

References 

1913 births
1997 deaths
Economists from New York (state)
Temple University alumni
Columbian College of Arts and Sciences alumni
20th-century American economists
People from Manhattan
Fellows of the American Statistical Association
Mathematicians from New York (state)